Richwood Township is an inactive township in McDonald County, in the U.S. state of Missouri.

Richwood Township was established in 1866, and most likely named after an early settler.

References

Townships in Missouri
Townships in McDonald County, Missouri